Silvio Grappasonni (born 9 August 1962) is an Italian professional golfer.

As an amateur Grappasoni represented Italy at the European Youths' Team Championship, the European Amateur Team Championship and at the Eisenhower Trophy.

He represented Italy six times in the World Cup between 1987 and 1997. He is the son of Ugo Grappasonni. He is a commentator on Italian Sky Sport.

Amateur wins
1979 Italian Close Amateur Championship
1983 Italian Close Amateur Championship

Professional wins (5)

Challenge Tour wins (1)
1989 Martini Trophy

Alps Tour wins (1)
2001 Il Bibop Carire Open

Other wins (3)
1987 Italian PGA Championship
1991 Italian National Open
1992 Italian National Open

Team appearances
Amateur
Jacques Léglise Trophy (representing the Continent of Europe): 1978 (winners), 1979
European Youths' Team Championship (representing Italy): 1978, 1980, 1982
European Boys' Team Championship (representing Italy): 1982 (winners)
European Amateur Team Championship (representing Italy): 1983
Eisenhower Trophy (representing Italy): 1984

Professional
World Cup (representing Italy): 1987, 1992, 1993, 1994, 1995, 1997
Dunhill Cup (representing Italy): 1987, 1992, 1996

References

External links

Italian male golfers
European Tour golfers
Sportspeople from Como
1962 births
Living people